A18 or A-18 is a three-character acronym that may refer to:
 A18 road (disambiguation), in several countries
 A-18 Shrike, a Curtiss Model 76A twin radial engine monoplane service test aircraft of the mid-1930s
 Aero A.18, a Czech fighter aircraft built in the 1920s
 Arrows A18, a Formula One car
 British NVC community A18 (Ranunculus fluitans community), a plant community
 Cunninghamella A18, a fungus strain
 A18, one of the Encyclopaedia of Chess Openings codes for the English Opening in chess
 Subfamily A18, a rhodopsin-like receptors subfamily
 F/A-18 Hornet, an all-weather carrier-based strike fighter designed to fill the roles of fighter aircraft and attack aircraft
 Station number of Toei Subway Asakusa station